Mincemeat is a mixture of chopped dried fruit, distilled spirits and spices, and often beef suet, usually used as a pie or pastry filling. Mincemeat formerly contained meat, notably beef or venison. Many modern recipes replace the suet with vegetable shortening. Mincemeat is found in the Anglosphere.

Etymology
The "mince" in mincemeat comes from the Middle English mincen, and the Old French mincier both traceable to the Vulgar Latin minutiare, meaning chop finely. The word mincemeat is an adaptation of an earlier term minced meat, meaning finely chopped meat.  Meat was also a term for food in general, not only animal flesh.

Variants and history

English recipes from the 15th, 16th, and 17th centuries describe a fermented mixture of meat and fruit used as a pie filling. These early recipes included vinegars and wines, but by the 18th century, distilled spirits, frequently brandy, were being used instead. The use of spices like clove, nutmeg, mace and cinnamon was common in late medieval and renaissance meat dishes. The increase of sweetness from added sugar made mincemeat less a savoury dinner course and helped to direct its use toward desserts.

16th-century recipe

Pyes of mutton or beif must be fyne mynced & seasoned with pepper and salte and a lytel saffron to colour it / suet or marrow a good quantitie / a lytell vynegre / pruynes / great reasons / and dates / take the fattest of the broath of powdred beefe. And if you will have paest royall / take butter and yolkes of egges & so to temper the floure to make the paest.

Pies of mutton or beef must be finely minced and seasoned with pepper and salt, and a little saffron to colour it. [Add] a good quantity of suet or marrow, a little vinegar, prunes, raisins and dates. [Put in] the fattest of the broth of salted beef. And, if you want Royal pastry, take butter and egg yolks and [combine them with] flour to make the paste.

In the mid- to late eighteenth century, mincemeat in Europe had become associated with old-fashioned, rural, or homely foods. Victorian England rehabilitated the preparation as a traditional Yuletide treat.

19th-century recipe

Ingredients — 2 lb. of raisins, 3 lb. currants,  lb. of lean beef, 3 lb. of beef suet, 2 lb. of moist sugar, 2 oz. of citron, 2 oz. of candied lemon-peel, 2 oz. of candied orange-peel, 1 small nutmeg, 1 pottle of apples, the rind of 2 lemons, the juice of 1,  pint of brandy.
Mode — Stone and cut the raisins once or twice across, but do not chop them; wash, dry, and pick the currants free from stalks and grit, and mince the beef and suet, taking care the latter is chopped very fine; slice the citron and candied peel, grate the nutmeg, and pare, core, and mince the apples; mince the lemon-peel, strain the juice, and when all the ingredients are thus prepared, mix them well together, adding the brandy when the other things are well blended; press the whole into a jar, carefully exclude the air, and the mincemeat will be ready for use in a fortnight.

Apple mincemeat
By the late 19th century, "apple mincemeat" was recommended as a "hygienic" alternative, using apples, suet, currants, brown sugar, raisins, allspice, orange juice, lemons, mace and apple cider, but no meat.

A recipe for apple mincemeat appears in a 1910 issue of The Irish Times, made with apples, suet, currants, sugar, raisins, orange juice, lemons, spice and brandy.

20th century

By the mid-twentieth century, most mincemeat recipes did not include meat, but might include animal fat in the form of suet or butter, or alternatively solid vegetable fats, making it vegan. Some recipes continue to include venison, minced beef sirloin or minced heart, along with dried fruit, spices, chopped apple, and fresh citrus peel, Zante currants, candied fruits, citron, and brandy, rum, or other liquor. Mincemeat is aged to deepen flavours, with alcohol changing the overall texture of the mixture by breaking down the meat proteins. Preserved mincemeat may be stored for up to ten years.

Mincemeat can be produced at home. Commercial preparations, primarily without meat, packaged in jars, foil-lined boxes, or tins, are commonly available.

Mince pies and tarts are frequently consumed during the Christmas holiday season. In the northeast United States, mincemeat pies are also a traditional part of the Thanksgiving holiday. 

Like other pies, mince pies are sometimes served with cheese, notably cheddar.

References

Notes

Bibliography 
 Cunningham, Marion. The Fannie Farmer Cookbook. Alfred A. Knopf: 1979. .
 Kiple, Kenneth F. and Kriemhild Coneè Ornelas. The Cambridge World History of Food. Cambridge University Press: 2000. .

External links 
 

Food ingredients
Fruit dishes